This article lists all rugby league footballers who have played first-grade for the Newcastle Knights in the National Rugby League.

NOTES:
 Debut:
 Players are listed in the order of their debut game with the club.
 Players that debuted in the same game are added alphabetically.
 Appearances: Newcastle Knights games only, not a total of their career games. For example, Jeremy Smith has played a career total of 214 first-grade games but of those, 75 were at Newcastle.
 Previous Club: refers to the previous first-grade rugby league club (NRL or Super League) the player played at and does not refer to any junior club, Rugby Union club or a rugby league club he was signed to but never played at.
 Current players are indicated in bold text for their Knights career years.
 The statistics in this table are correct as of the end of round 3 of the 2023 NRL season.

List of players

See also
 List of Newcastle Knights Women's players

External links
Official Debut Numbers
Rugby League Tables - Newcastle Point Scorers
Rugby League Project - List of Players
Rugby League Project - Newcastle Knights Transfers & Debuts

 
Players
Lists of Australian rugby league players
National Rugby League lists
New South Wales-related lists